Safco is the first petrochemical company in Saudi Arabia. It was established  in 1965. SABIC owns 42.99% with 57.01% being held by the private sector and the public.

Operations
SAFCO  is one of the largest producers of urea in the world with an annual production capacity of over 2.6 million tons of urea while its ammonia annual production capacity is 2.3 million tons. Also SAFCO owns  3.87% share in the capital of Arabian Industrial Fibers Company (IBN RUSHD) and 1.69% in the capital of Yanbu National Petrochemical Company (YANSAB).

See also
 List of companies of Saudi Arabia
 List of largest companies in Saudi Arabia

References

External links

1965 establishments in Saudi Arabia
Chemical companies established in 1965
Manufacturing companies of Saudi Arabia
Petrochemical companies
SABIC
Jubail